Paul Prendiville (born 10 April 1954), also known by the nickname of 'Taffy', is a Welsh former professional rugby league footballer who played in the 1970s and 1980s.

Prendiville won caps for Wales while at Hull in 1979 against England, in 1980 against England, in 1981 against France, and England, in 1982 against Australia, and while at Leeds in 1984 against England, and won a cap for Great Britain while at Hull in 1982 against France.

Paul Prendiville played , i.e. number 5, in Hull FC's 5-10 defeat by Hull Kingston Rovers in the 1980 Challenge Cup Final during the 1979–80 season at Wembley Stadium, London on Saturday 3 May 1980, in front of a crowd of 95,000, played  in the 14-14 draw with Widnes in the 1982 Challenge Cup Final during the 1981–82 season at Wembley Stadium, London on Saturday 1 May 1982, in front of a crowd of 92,147, and played  in the 18-9 victory over Widnes in the 1982 Challenge Cup Final replay during the 1981–82 season at Elland Road, Leeds on Wednesday 19 May 1982, in front of a crowd of 41,171.

Prendiville played , i.e. number 5, in Great Britain's 7-8 defeat by France in the friendly at Stadio Pier Luigi Penzo, Venice on Saturday 31 July 1982.

Prendiville played , i.e. number 5, and scored a try in Hull FC's 18-7 victory over Bradford Northern in the 1982 Yorkshire County Cup Final during the 1982–83 season at Elland Road, Leeds on Saturday 2 October 1982.

Prendiville played , i.e. number 5, in Hull FC's 12-4 victory over Hull Kingston Rovers in the 1981–82 John Player Trophy Final during the 1981–82 season at Headingley Rugby Stadium, Leeds on Saturday 23 January 1982, and played , i.e. number 2, in Leeds' 18-10 victory over Widnes in the 1983–84 John Player Special Trophy Final during the 1983–84 season at Central Park, Wigan on Saturday 14 January 1984.

References

External links
!Great Britain Statistics at englandrl.co.uk (statistics currently missing due to not having appeared for both Great Britain, and England)
 (archived by web.archive.org) Stats – Past Players – P
 (archived by web.archive.org) Statistics at hullfc.com
(archived by web.archive.org) Hall of Fame at hullfc.com

1954 births
Living people
Footballers who switched code
Great Britain national rugby league team players
Hull F.C. players
Leeds Rhinos players
Rugby league centres
Rugby league players from Llanelli
Rugby league wingers
Wales national rugby league team players
Welsh rugby league players
York Wasps players